Schuurmansiella is a monotypic genus of plant in the family Ochnaceae.  The Plant List recognises the single species Schuurmansiella angustifolia. The specific epithet  is from the Latin meaning "narrow leaf".

Description
The flowers are white with a pink base.

Distribution and habitat
Schuurmansiella angustifolia is endemic to Borneo and confined to western Sarawak. Its habitat is lowland, mainly kerangas, forests from sea-level to  altitude.

References

Ochnaceae
Monotypic Malpighiales genera
Endemic flora of Borneo
Flora of Sarawak